Matheus Nogueira da Silva (born 8 August 1986), known as Matheus Nogueira, is a Brazilian footballer who plays for Londrina Futebol Clube / Londrina  as a goalkeeper

Career statistics

References

External links

1986 births
Living people
Brazilian footballers
Association football goalkeepers
Associação Ferroviária de Esportes players
Footballers from São Paulo